Aleksey Borisovich Mozgovoy or Mozgovoi (3 April 1975 – 23 May 2015) was a commander of the self-proclaimed Luhansk People's Republic in Ukraine. He was the leader of the pro-Russian Prizrak Brigade and also served as "judge" on the "People's Court", notorious for issuing controversial death sentences. 

He was assassinated in Donbas, with multiple theories about who was responsible. In 2020 he was found guilty posthumously by a separatist court of a murder-for-money of a family and crippling of a ten-year-old child.

Biography 
Mozgovoy was born in the village of Nizhnyaya Duvanka, Svatove Raion, Luhansk Oblast located in the eastern part of Ukraine. Mozgovoy grew up in Svatove township where he participated in a local choir, the Svatove Cossacks. Just before the 2014 pro-Russian unrest in Ukraine, Mozgovoy was a guest worker employed as a cook in Saint Petersburg. 

In 2014, during conflict in eastern Ukraine, he became commander of the military formation "Prizrak" (Ghost). Unofficially, his armed group was known as the Antratsyt Cossacks. Mozgovoy was allied with Igor Girkin, the Donetsk People's Republic minister for defense. He was known for infighting with other Luhansk People's Republic (LPR) rebels. Mozgovoy had contact with the leader of the Liberal Democratic Party of Russia, Vladimir Zhirinovsky, and the leader of A Just Russia, Sergei Mironov.

Prior to his death, Mozgovoy's Prizrak brigade had been having supply issues due to his refusal to join the formal LPR power structure. It had dwindled from 3,000 fighters to several hundred. Mozgovoy and two of his colleagues, Andrey Kozlov and Anna Samelyuk, decided to move into politics and, with the assistance of the Organization for Security and Co-operation in Europe (OSCE), sent an application to Kyiv to register the political party Narodnoye vozrozhdeniye (National Renewal). 

It was sent to Kyiv instead of to Lugansk as a proper legal process did not yet exist in the LPR for the registration of political parties. The application was received by Ukraine's Ministry of Justice on May 5, and accepted by May 8, thus becoming the first and only political party registered by Ukraine that originated in one of the breakaway rebel territories, and the only one that Ukraine would recognize legally according to the Minsk II peace agreement. 

On May 8 2015, there was an international anti-fascist forum in the city of Alchevsk in the LPR, which included around 100 attendees, including OSCE members. By the evening, the registration of the new party had become widely known among the attendees. The following day, the LPR authorities denied Mozgovoy permission to stage a May 9 Victory Day parade.

Death 
A roadside bombing was followed by machine-gun fire. Mozgovoy, press secretary Anna Samelyuk, a driver, and six bodyguards were killed.

Mozgovoy had survived a similar assassination attempt in the same area two months before. He was said to be dismissive of threats to his life.

The LPR press service attributed the attack to unspecified "saboteurs". Surviving leaders of the Prizrak Brigade stated that Ukrainian commandos were responsible, and they called on their supporters not to spread false rumors. Anton Gerashchenko, the adviser to the Ukrainian minister for internal affairs, said Mozgovoy had been assassinated by Russian GRU special forces. Mozgovoy's supporters widely believed that Igor Plotnitksy, the head of the LNR, was responsible for his death.

On May 23, 2016, a statue of Mozgovoy was erected in Alchevsk, Ukraine.

In 2020 a court in the unrecognized Luhansk People's Republic determined that Mozgovoy and fellow Prizrak brigade member Aleksandr Kostin had planned and commanded the 2014 ambush and murder of a family for cash. Oleh and Iryna Burykhin were shot dead in their car, and their ten-year-old daughter Liza was left an invalid from her wounds.

Controversy
In October 2014 Mozgovoy presided over a so-called "people's court" that issued a death sentence against a suspect accused of rape by asking the audience to raise hands. Answering questions from the audience afterward, Mozgovoy said that he ordered his patrols to "arrest any woman found sitting in a pub or cafe".

The statement that caused the controversy was:

After the statement caused a significant critical response in Russian media, he had to explain that he said that because he thought that women "should care about their safety", that the intention of the statement was to make people think about morals and that he was not going to arrest anyone. Despite this, in an interview to Novaya Gazeta on 17 November 2014, Mozgovoy claimed that "young girls who need to give birth to children so that there is no demographic crisis are ruining their bodies instead", underlining that "in the old days was it generally forbidden for a girl to sit at the table [...] Because she is a mother first and foremost. But what kind of mother will she be if she ruined her body with alcohol, and now also with drugs?".

See also 

 Separatist forces of the war in Donbas
 Alexander Bednov
 
 Gennadiy Tsypkalov
 Arsen Pavlov
 List of unsolved murders
 Valery Bolotov
 Mikhail Tolstykh
 Alexander Zakharchenko

References

External links

 Official website
 Mozgovoy poetry
 Mozgovoy performs a song "My little daughter" in Ukrainian language
 Aleksei Mozgovoy at the Novorossiya Information agency
 (eng subs) Militia brigade "Ghost" takes oath to Novorossia 09/09/14
 Ukraine crisis: Inside pro-Russia militia training camp. BBC News. 19 May 2014

1975 births
2015 deaths
Don Cossacks
Male murder victims
People from Luhansk Oblast
People murdered in Ukraine
People of Anti-Maidan
People of the Luhansk People's Republic
Pro-Russian people of the 2014 pro-Russian unrest in Ukraine
Pro-Russian people of the war in Donbas
Military personnel killed in the Russo-Ukrainian War
Unsolved murders in Ukraine
Ukrainian collaborators with Russia
2015 murders in Ukraine